Samuel Groth and Matt Reid were the defending champions, but Groth chose not to compete.
Reid partnered with John-Patrick Smith.

Daniell and Jenkins won the title, defeating Dane Propoggia and Jose Rubin Statham in the final, 6–4, 6–4.

Seeds

Draw

Draw

References 
 Main draw

Charles Sturt Adelaide International - Doubles
2014 Doubles
Charles Sturt Adelaide International - Doubles